The Heart's Awakening is a song by Albert Ketèlbey, composed in 1907. It was published the same year by Novello.

The Heart's Awakening became the title of a collection of the composer's songs and piano music, recorded by tenor Peter Dempsey and pianist Guy Rowland.

References

External links 
 The Music of Albert W. Ketèlbey / A Catalogue, compiled by Tom McCanna

1907 songs
Compositions by Albert Ketèlbey